The Bremner River is a  tributary of the Copper River in the Valdez–Cordova Census Area of the U.S. state of Alaska. It was named in 1885 by Lieutenant H. T. Allen for John Bremner, a prospector who sought gold along the river and was the first non-native person to go there.

The entire course of the river lies within Wrangell–St. Elias National Park and Preserve.

Boating
The main stem of the Bremner River below the confluence of its north and middle forks is runnable by boaters who are "seasoned Alaska wilderness travelers with advanced to expert boating skills." Rated Class II (medium) to IV (very difficult) on the International Scale of River Difficulty, the river passes through mountainous terrain and dense forests that make for difficult access and troublesome hiking. Other hazards include cold, swift, silty water; isolation; narrow canyons; brown bears, and strong winds near the mouth.

See also
List of rivers of Alaska

References

External links

Rivers of Alaska
Rivers of Chugach Census Area, Alaska
Rivers of Unorganized Borough, Alaska